The 2023 North Queensland Cowboys season will be the 29th in the club's history. Coached by Todd Payten and captained by Jason Taumalolo and Chad Townsend, they will compete in the NRL's 2023 Telstra Premiership.

Season summary

Milestones

Squad

Squad movement

Gains

Losses

Re-signings

Ladder

Fixtures

Pre-season

Regular season

Statistics

Representatives
The following players played a representative match in 2023.

Honours

Feeder Clubs

Women's team

References

North Queensland Cowboys seasons
North Queensland Cowboys season